Easternijtsjerk is a village in Noardeast-Fryslân in the province of Friesland, the Netherlands. It had a population of around 944 in January 2017. Before 2019, the village was part of the Dongeradeel municipality.

History 
The village was first mentioned in 1224 as Nova Ecclesia, and means the new eastern church to differentiate from Westernijtsjerk. Easternijtsjerk appeared after a dyke was built in the 11th or 12th century. The Dutch Reformed church received its current shape in the 15th century and has a 13th century tower. In 1840, Easternijtsjerk was home to 695 people.

References

External links

Noardeast-Fryslân
Populated places in Friesland